The Royal Lao Police (French: Police Royale Laotiènne – PRL), was the official national police force of the Kingdom of Laos from 1949 to 1975, operating closely with the Royal Lao Armed Forces (FAR) during the Laotian Civil War between 1960 and 1975.

History
The Royal Lao Police was first established in 1949 by the French Union authorities.

Structure
The Laotian security forces were divided into several 'branches of service', which comprised a plainclothes criminal investigation department, an immigration service, an customs service, an urban constabulary, a regional gendarmerie and a counter-insurgency armed support unit. All these formations were answerable to the Laotian Ministry of the Interior of the Royal Lao Government in Vientiane.

Constabulary
The regular Laotian Police branch, this was the uniformed urban constabulary – also designated Civil Police, Civil Police Force (French: Force de Police Civile) or National Police Corps (French: Corps de Police Nationale) – tasked of providing security and maintaining law and order in the main population centers, including the nation's capital city and the provincial capitals.

Gendarmerie
Successor of the French colonial 'Indigenous Guard', the paramilitary Laotian Gendarmerie was tasked of patrolling the countryside.

Royal Laotian Customs Service
The RLCS was set up in the mid-1950s to enforce border control and supervise the flux of personnel and goods on the nation's main riverine ports, airports, and at the border crossings with neighboring Thailand, Burma, China, Cambodia and Vietnam.

Directorate of National Coordination/Frontier Police

One particular ephemeral 'branch' of the Laotian security forces that is worth mention is the Directorate of National Coordination or DNC (French: Direction de Coordination Nationale – DCN) paramilitary Security Agency. The DNC begun as a airborne-qualified paramilitary élite police field force closely modelled after the Royal Thai Police (RTP) Police Aerial Resupply Unit (PARU) 'Commandos' and similar in function to the Republic of Vietnam National Police Field Force. The unit had its origins in September 1960, when the PRL command entrusted the then Lieutenant colonel Siho Lamphouthacoul the creation of a 'Special Mobile Group' (French: Groupement Mobile Speciale 1 – GMS 1) composed of two paramilitary special battalions (French: Bataillons Speciales – BS), 11th and 33rd BS.

The new unit soon became involved in Laos' domestic politics during the turbulent period of the early 1960s, with its commander Lt. Col. Siho actively conspiring in Major general Phoumi Nosavan's return to power. Between mid-November and late December 1960, GMS 1 paramilitary battalions participated in the retaking of Vientiane from Captain Kong Le's rebel Neutralist airborne units, including the successful capture of the Laotian Aviation (French: Aviation Laotiènne) military runway at Wattay Airfield.

For his actions in support of his patron Major general Phoumi Nosavan's December 1960 countercoup, Lt. Col. Siho was rewarded with a promotion to Brigadier general and given command of a new paramilitary security organization: in March 1961 the GMS 1 was combined with Laotian National Army or ANL (military intelligence, psychological warfare, and military police units) and PRL (the civil police force and the immigration service) units to form the DNC. 
Answering only to Maj. Gen. Phoumi, Brig. Gen. Siho and its new security agency quickly took over police duties in Vientiane, exercising near absolute authority in the capital city and began screening the civilian population for Pathet Lao elements and stragglers, which often led to abuses. Brig. Gen. Siho's actions cost funding from the U.S. for police training; however, his GMS 1 was considered the most effective paramilitary unit in the Royal Lao Armed Forces (French: Forces Armées du Royaume – FAR).

Although originally intended to be used in intelligence-gathering and Commando operations, the GMS was primarily kept in Vientiane to support Siho's illicit activities. In reality, the GMS served principally as Siho's personal bodyguard, gaining a reputation among the civilian populace for both corruption in police duties and military ability as para-commandos. One source refers to them as "gangsters" involved in prostitution, gambling, extortion, sabotage, kidnapping, torture, and political repression.

In 1962 a 30-man contingent was sent to Thailand to attend Airborne and Commando courses manned by Royal Thai Police (RTP) instructors from the Police Aerial Resupply Unit (PARU) at their Camp Narusuan training facilities located near Hua Hin in Prachuap Khiri Khan Province. Upon their return to Laos, they formed the cadre of a new special battalion, 99 BS, which enabled GMS 1 to attain full regimental strength. A DNC training depot and an airborne course were established at Phone Kheng in Vientiane, where 11, 33, and 99 BS were all given parachute training. In 1963 Brig. Gen. Siho appointed Lieutenant colonel Thao Ty as his replacement at the head of the GMS 1 para-commando regiment, while retaining the command of the DNC.

On 18 April 1964, Brig. Gen. Siho staged a coup d'état, during which his DNC police units seized the capital's public infrastructure and took control of the country. However, the coup was short-lived, as Brig. Gen. Siho received international criticism and was quickly outranked by Major general Kouprasith Abhay, who succeeded in being nominated Deputy Commander-in-Chief of the Royal Lao Army (RLA), whilst his ally Major general Ouane Rattikone became the Commander-in-Chief. In response, Siho changed the GMS 1 designation to 'Border Police' or 'Frontier Police' (French: Police de Frontiers), and kept a low profile.

On 1–3 February 1965, the DNC which had held de facto control over Vientiane during the previous year, was defeated and disbanded by the RLA in the wake of another coup d'état led by Maj. Gen. Kouprasith Abhay held that same month. Brig. Gen. Siho was forced to exile in Thailand and his DNC 'empire' was quickly divided, with its units being disbanded: the military intelligence, psychological warfare, and military police personnel were returned to the RLA structure whilst some of the policemen were kept in service and renamed the National Police Corps, which was assigned to the Ministry of the Interior of the Royal Lao Government. After two days of negotiations, the DNC's three airborne-qualified Border Police Special Battalions – BS 33, BS 11, and BS 99 – and their commander, Lieutenant colonel Thao Ty agreed to lay down their arms with the option of transferring to the RLA's airborne forces command. By mid-year they had been moved to Seno, near Savannakhet and consolidated into a new parachute regiment, Airborne Mobile Group 21 (French: Groupement Mobile 21 Aeroportée – GM 21) under Thao Ty's command.

Training institutions
Police training was the responsibility of the PRL Police School (French: École de Police), built by the United States Programs Evaluation Office (PEO) in the early 1960s at Ban Donnoun, located 10 kilometers east of Vientiane, where U.S. instructors taught Laotian cadres basic police procedures. In addition, selected PRL personnel were also sent to France, Thailand and the United States to attend specialized courses.

List of DNC and PRL commanders
Lieutenant colonel Siho Lamphouthacoul
Major general Lith Luenamachack

Notable DNC and PRL field commanders
Lieutenant colonel Thao Ty

Uniforms and insignia

Royal Lao Police ranks

See also
1967 Opium War
First Indochina War
Laotian Civil War
Ministry of Public Security (Laos)
Royal Lao Armed Forces
Royal Lao Army Airborne
Republic of Vietnam National Police
Republic of Vietnam National Police Field Force
Royal Thai Police Aerial Resupply Unit (PARU)
Vietnam War
Weapons of the Laotian Civil War

Notes

References

 Jeremy Kuzmarov, Modernizing Repression: Police Training and Nation Building in the American Century, University of Massachusetts Press, 2012. , 1558499172
 Kenneth Conboy and Simon McCouaig, The War in Laos 1960-75, Men-at-arms series 217, Osprey Publishing Ltd, London 1989. 
 Kenneth Conboy and Simon McCouaig, South-East Asian Special Forces, Elite series 33, Osprey Publishing Ltd, London 1991. 
 Kenneth Conboy with James Morrison, Shadow War: The CIA's Secret War in Laos, Boulder CO: Paladin Press, 1995. , 1581605358
 Maj. Gen. Oudone Sananikone, The Royal Lao Army and U.S. Army advice and support, Indochina monographs series, United States Army Center of Military History, Washington D.C. 1981. – 
 Timothy Castle, At War in the Shadow of Vietnam: United States Military Aid to the Royal Lao Government, 1955–1975, Columbia University Press, 1993. 
 Victor B. Anthony and Richard R. Sexton, The War in Northern Laos, Command for Air Force History, 1993.

Further reading

 Kenneth Conboy and Don Greer, War in Laos, 1954-1975, Carrollton, TX: Squadron/Signal Publications, 1994. 
 Khambang Sibounheuang (edited by Edward Y. Hall), White Dragon Two: A Royal Laotian Commando's Escape from Laos, Spartanburg, SC: Honoribus Press, 2002. 
 Nina S. Adams and Alfred W. McCoy (eds.), Laos: War and Revolution, Harper & Row, New York 1970. 
 Roger Warner, Shooting at the Moon: The Story of America's clandestine War in Laos, South Royalton VE: Steerforth Press, 1998. 
 Perry Steiglitz, In a Little Kingdom, M.E. Sharpe, 1990. , 0873326172
 Thomas L. Jr. Ahern, Undercover Armies: CIA and Surrogate Warfare in Laos, Center for the Study of Intelligence, 2006. Classified control no. C05303949.
 Martin Windrow and Mike Chappell, The French Indochina War 1946–54, Men-at-arms series 322, Osprey Publishing Ltd, Oxford 1998.

External links
Country Study - Kingdom of Laos
Country data Laos – National Police and Paramilitary forces
Royal Lao Armed Forces and Police heraldry

Law enforcement in Laos
National Central Bureaus of Interpol
Royal Lao Armed Forces
Military units and formations disestablished in the 1970s
1975 disestablishments in Laos
1949 establishments in Laos